Carl William Prause (October 5, 1893 – March 26, 1970) was an American football coach and college athletics administrator. He served as a second lieutenant in the 118th Infantry 30th Division in the United States Army during World War I and was awarded the Distinguished Service Cross. He was the seventh head football coach at The Citadel, serving for eight seasons, from 1922 to 1929, and compiling a record of 41–32–4. He died at a Charleston hospital in 1970.

Head coaching record

References

External links
 

1893 births
1970 deaths
United States Army personnel of World War I
The Citadel Bulldogs athletic directors
The Citadel Bulldogs football coaches